Stephen Paul Martin  (born 24 June 1948) is a former Australian politician, senior academic and rugby league referee. He served as an Australian Labor Party (ALP) member of the Australian House of Representatives for the seat of Macarthur, south west of Sydney, from 1984 to 1993; and, following redistribution, represented Cunningham from 1993 until his resignation in 2002. Martin was the Chief Executive of the Committee for Economic Development of Australia (CEDA) from January 2011 until his retirement in April 2017.

Early life
Martin was born in Wollongong, New South Wales and received a BA at the Australian National University, an MA at the University of Alberta, a Master of Town and Country Planning at the University of Sydney, a Diploma of Education at the University of New South Wales and a PhD at the University of Wollongong. Prior to entering parliament, Martin served as a high school teacher with the New South Wales Department of Education, a lecturer at the University of Wollongong, and a Town Planner with the NSW Department of Environment and Planning serving as Regional Manager for the Macarthur Region. He also served as an Alderman on Wollongong City Council from 1983 to 1985.

Rugby league career
Martin had a successful career as a rugby league referee and administrator.

In 1984 Martin refereed the Illawarra Rugby League first grade grand final, a feat that was subsequently acknowledged in Hansard. Martin was also the Referees' Association Treasurer in 1979–80 and Secretary in 1981–82.

Martin subsequently became a director of the Illawarra Steelers. He resigned from the board of directors in 1995 in protest of the club's refusal to open talks with News Limited during the Super League War and the sacking of coach Graham Murray.

Political career
Martin served as Parliamentary Secretary to the Minister for Foreign Affairs and Trade from 27 December 1991 to 24 March 1993 and was elected Speaker of the Australian House of Representatives on 4 May 1993, a position that he held until the election of the Howard government in 1996.

During his time as Speaker, he became the first Speaker to be given the power to suspend a member of the House for one hour without a vote by House members.

This has been imposed as Section 94a of the House of Representatives Standing Orders.

Martin resigned on 16 August 2002 causing a by-election which was subsequently won by Michael Organ running for the Australian Greens.

After politics
After a period as President of the University of Wollongong campus in Dubai, Martin took the position of Pro Vice-Chancellor (International) at Victoria University in Melbourne in January 2005. His major contributions were to transform Victoria University's international operations and to create Victoria University International (VUI) as a unit of the University.

In March 2008 Martin became Deputy Vice Chancellor (Strategy and Planning) at Curtin University of Technology in Perth. In April 2009 he took up the position of Senior Consultant with the Slade Group in Melbourne.

In June 2010, Martin joined the Southern Cross University Graduate College of Management in the role of Professor of Business Research and director of the Doctor of Business Administration (DBA) program and left in November 2010.

Martin was appointed to the Chief Executive of the Committee for Economic Development of Australia (CEDA) on 1 January 2011.

In June 2022, Martin was appointed Officer of the Order of Australia in the 2022 Queen's Birthday Honours for "distinguished service to the people and Parliament of Australia, to charitable organisations, and to regional sport and education".

References

1948 births
20th-century Australian politicians
21st-century Australian politicians
Australian Labor Party members of the Parliament of Australia
Australian rugby league referees
Living people
Members of the Australian House of Representatives for Cunningham
Members of the Australian House of Representatives for Macarthur
Officers of the Order of Australia
People from Wollongong
Speakers of the Australian House of Representatives
Victoria University, Melbourne
University of Wollongong alumni